The  (French for North Road) is an isolated wilderness road in central Quebec, Canada, connecting Chibougamau with the James Bay Road at km 275. Extensive logging takes place along the southern half of this road.

There are no services available along the full length of the North Road, except at km 290 at the Cree Construction Company where fuel and repair services are periodically available. Also, fuel, food, and lodging can be obtained in the Cree village of Nemaska during the day time.


Waypoints

See also
List of Quebec provincial highways

References
Live through enormous: Visit the James Bay, February 2005.

External links
http://jamesbayroad.com/nr/index.html

Roads in Nord-du-Québec
James Bay Project